The 1988 Pan American Race Walking Cup was held in Mar del Plata, Buenos Aires, Argentina, on 12–13 November.  The track of the Cup runs in the Boulevard Marítimo Félix U. Camet.

Complete results, medal winners until 2011, and the results for the Mexican athletes were published.

Medallists

Results

Men's 20 km

Team

Men's 50 km

Team

Women's 10 km

Team

Participation
The participation of 74 athletes from 9 countries is reported.

 (12)
 (12)
 (7)
 (2)
 (2)
 México (12)
 Panamá (1)
 (13)
 (11)

See also
 1988 Race Walking Year Ranking

References

Pan American Race Walking Cup
Pan American Race Walking Cup
Pan American Race Walking Cup
International athletics competitions hosted by Argentina